Gin Gliders Inc. is a South Korean aircraft manufacturer based in Yongin, founded by competition pilot Gin Seok Song in 1998. The company specializes in the design and manufacture of paragliders in the form of ready-to-fly aircraft.

The company's paragliders are designed by Gin Seok Song and Robert Graham.

The company has produced a wide variety of paragliders, including the competition Gin Boomerang, the intermediate Bolero Plus, Gangster, Nomad and Oasis, as well as the two-place Bongo.

Paragliders 

Summary of aircraft built by Gin Gliders:
Gin Atlas
Gin Bandit
Gin Bobcat
Gin Bolero
Gin Bolero Plus
Gin Bonanza
Gin Bonanza 2
Gin Bonanza 3
Gin Bongo
Gin Boomerang
Gin Camino
Gin Carrera
Gin Explorer
Gin Explorer 2
Gin Falcon
Gin Fluid
Gin Fuse
Gin Gangster
Gin GTO
Gin Leopard
Gin Nano
Gin Nomad
Gin Oasis
Gin Osprey
Gin Pegasus
Gin Puma
Gin Rage
Gin Safari
Gin Sprint
Gin Tribe
Gin Vantage
Gin Yak
Gin Yeti

References

External links

Aircraft manufacturers of South Korea
Paragliders
Manufacturing companies established in 1998
South Korean brands
South Korean companies established in 1998